Rithvik Dhanjani (born 5 November 1988) is an Indian actor who primarily works in Hindi television and web shows. He made his acting debut in 2009, portraying Parth in Bandini. Dhanjani earned wider recognition with his portrayal of Arjun Digvijay Kirloskar in Pavitra Rishta. He is a recipient of one Indian Telly Award and Gold Award each, along with other nominations.

Dhanjani had his first success with Pyaar Kii Ye Ek Kahaani, where he was seen portraying Jay Khurana. His film debut Jo Hum Chahein (2011), failed to leave a mark. 2013, marked a turning point in his career when he turned host with Yeh Hai Aashiqui and his success there led to him hosting other shows including India's Next Superstars, Super Dancer, India's Best Dramebaaz and So You Think You Can Dance. He made his web debut with I Don't Watch TV (2016) and has been part of successful web series including XXX (2018) and Cartel (2021). 

In addition to acting, Dhanjani has won reality shows such as Nach Baliye 6, with his then partner Asha Negi and I Can Do That.

Early life 
Dhanjani was born on 5 November 1988 in Mandsaur, Madhya Pradesh. His family, who's Sindhi, moved to Dubai soon after he was born. He has a younger sister named Heena Dhanjani. He did his schooling in Dubai and complete his graduation from City of London College, London. In his college days, he was into acting, modeling and hosting shows.

Later, Dhanjani got involved in theater for as long as two and a half years. After doing theatre and events in Dubai, he decided to shift to Mumbai to become an actor. He then did an acting course from the Kishore Namit Kapoor Institute before entering the television industry.

Personal life 
Dhanjani met actress Asha Negi on the set of Pavitra Rishta in 2011 and later they began dating each other. Dhanjani and Negi parted ways in May 2020, after dating for 7 years.

Career

Debut and early roles (2009–2012) 
Dhanjani began his acting career with a cameo in Bandini in 2009, where he played Parth, a negative character. He then portrayed supporting parts of Prithvi Pundir in Bairi Piya from 2009 to 2010 and Partho Rawal in Tere Liye in 2010. 

He had his big break with Pyaar Kii Ye Ek Kahaani where he played the antagonist, Jay Khurana from 2010 to 2011, who was a werewolf and in love with Sukirti Kandpal's character. In 2011, he made his film debut with Jo Hum Chahein, portraying Akash. The film received mixed to negative reviews and was a box-office failure. He also worked in the short film, Aftermath portraying Ali. 

In June 2012 Rithvik entered Jhalak Dikhhla Jaa 5 as wild card entry and became the second runner up.

Establishment as an actor and presenter (2013-2019) 
[[File:Ekta Kapoor introduces the new cast of Pavitra Rishta.jpg|thumb|Dhanjani with Pavitra Rishta'''s team]]

Dhanjani's portrayal of Arjun Digvijay Kirloskar opposite Asha Negi in Balaji Telefilms's Pavitra Rishta proved as a major turning point in his career. He portrayed the character from 2011 to 2014. Dhanjani won Indian Telly Award for Best Actor in a Supporting Role for his performance, along with various other nominations.

In 2013, he hosted India's Best Dramebaaz with Ragini Khanna. From 2013 to 2015, he hosted two seasons of Yeh Hai Aashiqui, which gained him further praises. In 2013, he also portrayed Kabir, opposite Mihika Verma in an episode of Yeh hai Aashiqui. In 2015, he and Negi recreated their love story in the final episode of Season 1.

The same year, he participated in Nach Baliye 6 with his then partner Asha Negi and they emerged as the winners. In 2014, he portrayed Vidhyut in MTV Fanaah. In the same year, he participated in the dance reality show Dare 2 Dance and hosted the finale episode of India's Raw Star. He hosted a variety of shows such as V Distraction and Nach Baliye 7 with Karan Patel. 

Dhanjani emerged as the winner of the stunt based reality show I Can Do That. He has also hosted India's Best Dramebaaz (Season 2) the same year. Dhanjani hosted four shows in 2016 including Pyaar Ki Yeh Kahani Suno, So You Think You Can Dance, Man Vs. Job and  Super Dancer (Chapter 1). Dhanjani nade his web debut with I Don't Watch TV in 2016.

In 2017, he first hosted Aye Zindagi and then participated in Fear Factor: Khatron Ke Khiladi 8 and ended at 7th place. He also participated in Lip Sing Battle. From 2017 to 2018, he hosted Super Dancer (Chapter 2), for which he won Gold Award for Best Anchor, and Rasoi Ki Jung Mummyon Ke Sung. He hosted, India's Next Superstars and India's Got Talent 8 in 2018. 

Dhanjani portrayed Shivam Chaturvedi, opposite Anita Hassanandani in Galti Se Mis-Tech. It received positive reviews. He portrayed Mayank in XXX, both in 2018. He hosted Super Dancer Chapter 3 from 2018 to 2019.

 Expansion and recent work (2020-present) 
Dhanjani participated in Fear Factor: Khatron Ke Khiladi – Made in India in 2020. He stood at 7th place and quit the show midway. The same year, he appeared in Lockdown Rishtey, as a presenter. He then appeared in Ladies vs Gentlemen as panelist.

In 2021, He hosted Super Dancer (Chapter 4). He next portrayed Abhay Angre opposite Monica Dogra in 2021 series Cartel. Times of India praised his performance and noted, "The character arc of Rithvik Dhanjani’s is intriguing, and he shines through the various emotions his character displays."

Dhanjani in 2022 appeared in the short film, Arranged, portraying Tarun opposite Tridha Choudhury. Praising his performance, Times of India wrote, "Both, Tridha’s Richa and Rithvik’s Tarun are the most appealing and well-written characters of the film. Onscreen, they get along well, and their genuine and sincere performances contribute to the story's relatability." The same year, he hosted Global Excellence Awards and Indian Film Festival of Melbourne.

 Off-screen work and public image 
Dhanjani along with his Cartel team, joined a project named, "JO FO MO" with a NGO
to help the charity organizations raise funds for the migrant workers, during the Covid-19 pandemic.

Dhanjani ranked 15th in 2013 in Eastern Eye's 50 Sexiest Asian Men list. In the same list, he ranked 21st in 2014 and 20th in 2015. In Times of India''s Most Desirable Men on TV list, he was placed 13th in 2017.

Apart from acting, Dhanjani is an endorser for several brands and products, including Vivo. He also featured in Amazon Audible's ad film with Nakuul Mehta.

He has ramp walked in the ITA Creators Walk in 2017 and has been the cover model for several magazines such as Zing Magazine and Gr8 Magazine, where he featured with Asha Negi.

Filmography

Films

Television

Guest appearances

Web series

Accolades

See also
 List of Indian television actors

References

External links

Living people
21st-century Indian male actors
Indian male television actors
Male actors from Madhya Pradesh
Indian television presenters
Place of birth missing (living people)
Nach Baliye winners
1988 births
Fear Factor: Khatron Ke Khiladi participants
Sindhi people